Machine epsilon or machine precision is an upper bound on the relative approximation error due to rounding in floating point arithmetic. This value characterizes computer arithmetic in the field of numerical analysis, and by extension in the subject of computational science. The quantity is also called macheps and it has the symbols Greek epsilon .

There are two prevailing definitions. In numerical analysis, machine epsilon is dependent on the type of rounding used and is also called unit roundoff, which  has the symbol bold Roman u. However, by a less formal, but more widely-used definition, machine epsilon is independent of rounding method and may be equivalent to u or 2u.

Values for standard hardware arithmetics

The following table lists machine epsilon values for standard floating-point formats. Each format uses round-to-nearest.

Formal definition

Rounding is a procedure for choosing the representation of a real number in a floating point number system.  For a number system and a rounding procedure, machine epsilon is the maximum relative error of the chosen rounding procedure.

Some background is needed to determine a value from this definition. A floating point number system is characterized by a radix which is also called the base, and by the precision , i.e. the number of radix  digits of the significand (including any leading implicit bit). All the numbers with the same exponent, have the spacing, .

Since machine epsilon is a bound for relative error, it suffices to consider numbers with exponent . It also suffices to consider positive numbers. This value is the biggest possible numerator for the relative error. The denominator in the relative error is the number being rounded, which should be as small as possible to make the relative error large. The maximum occurs when  is at the upper end of its range. The  in the denominator is negligible compared to the numerator, so it is left off for expediency, and just  is taken as machine epsilon.

Arithmetic model

Numerical analysis uses machine epsilon to study the effects of rounding error. The actual errors of machine arithmetic are far too complicated to be studied directly, so instead, the following simple model is used. The IEEE arithmetic standard says all floating-point operations are done as if it were possible to perform the infinite-precision operation, and then, the result is rounded to a floating-point number. Suppose (1) ,  are floating-point numbers, (2)  is an arithmetic operation on floating-point numbers such as addition or multiplication, and (3)  is the infinite precision operation. According to the standard, the computer calculates:

By the meaning of machine epsilon, the relative error of the rounding is at most machine epsilon in magnitude, so:

where  in absolute magnitude is at most  or u. The books by Demmel and Higham in the references can be consulted to see how this model is used to analyze the errors of, say, Gaussian elimination.

Variant definitions
The IEEE standard does not define the terms machine epsilon and unit roundoff, so differing definitions of these terms are in use, which can cause some confusion.

The formal definition for machine epsilon is the one used by Prof. James Demmel in lecture scripts, the LAPACK linear algebra package, numerics research papers and some scientific computing software.  Most numerical analysts use the words machine epsilon and unit roundoff interchangeably with this meaning.

This alternative definition is much more widespread outside academia: machine epsilon is the difference between 1 and the next larger floating point number. 

By this definition,  equals the value of the unit in the last place relative to 1, i.e.

The prevalence of this definition is rooted in its use in the ISO C Standard for constants relating to floating-point types and corresponding constants in other programming languages. It is also widely used in scientific computing software, and in the numerics and computing literature.

How to determine machine epsilon

Where standard libraries do not provide precomputed values (as <float.h> does with FLT_EPSILON, DBL_EPSILON and LDBL_EPSILON for C and <limits> does with std::numeric_limits<T>::epsilon() in C++), the best way to determine machine epsilon is to refer to the table, above, and use the appropriate power formula.  Computing machine epsilon is often given as a textbook exercise. The following examples compute machine epsilon in the sense of the spacing of the floating point numbers at 1 rather than in the sense of the unit roundoff.

Note that results depend on the particular floating-point format used, such as float, double, long double, or similar as supported by the programming language, the compiler, and the runtime library for the actual platform.

Some formats supported by the processor might not be supported by the chosen compiler and operating system. Other formats might be emulated by the runtime library, including arbitrary-precision arithmetic available in some languages and libraries.

In a strict sense the term machine epsilon means the  accuracy directly supported by the processor (or coprocessor), not some  accuracy supported by a specific compiler for a specific operating system, unless it's known to use the best format.

IEEE 754 floating-point formats have the property that, when reinterpreted as a two's complement integer of the same width, they monotonically increase over positive values and monotonically decrease over negative values (see the binary representation of 32 bit floats). In languages that allow type punning and always use IEEE 754-1985, we can exploit this to compute a machine epsilon in constant time. For example, in C:

typedef union {
  long long i64;
  double d64;
} dbl_64;

double machine_eps (double value)
{
    dbl_64 s;
    s.d64 = value;
    s.i64++;
    return s.d64 - value;
}

Example on Python:
def machineEpsilon(func=float):
    machine_epsilon = func(1)
    while func(1)+machine_epsilon != func(1):
        machine_epsilon_last = machine_epsilon
        machine_epsilon = func(machine_epsilon) / func(2)
    return machine_epsilon_last
This will give a result of the same sign as value. If a positive result is always desired, the return statement of machine_eps can be replaced with:
    return (s.i64 < 0 ? value - s.d64 : s.d64 - value);

64-bit doubles give 2.220446e-16, which is 2−52 as expected.

Approximation
The following simple algorithm can be used to approximate the machine epsilon, to within a factor of two (one order of magnitude) of its true value, using a linear search.

 epsilon = 1.0;
 
 while (1.0 + 0.5 * epsilon) ≠ 1.0:
     epsilon = 0.5 * epsilon

The machine epsilon,  can also simply be calculated as two to the negative power of the number of bits used for the mantissa.

Relationship to absolute relative error

If  is the machine representation of a number  then the absolute relative error in the representation is

Proof

The following proof is limited to positive numbers and machine representations using round-by-chop.

If , where  is the number of bits used for the magnitude of the significand, then: 

 

 
 

Although this proof is limited to positive numbers and round-by-chop, the same method can be used to prove the inequality in relation to negative numbers and round-to-nearest machine representations.

See also
 Floating point, general discussion of accuracy issues in floating point arithmetic
 Unit in the last place (ULP)

Notes and references

 Anderson, E.; LAPACK Users' Guide, Society for Industrial and Applied Mathematics (SIAM), Philadelphia, PA, third edition, 1999.
 Cody, William J.; MACHAR: A Soubroutine to Dynamically Determine Machine Parameters, ACM Transactions on Mathematical Software, Vol. 14(4), 1988, 303-311.
 Besset, Didier H.; Object-Oriented Implementation of Numerical Methods, Morgan & Kaufmann, San Francisco, CA, 2000.
 Demmel, James W., Applied Numerical Linear Algebra, Society for Industrial and Applied Mathematics (SIAM), Philadelphia, PA, 1997.
 Higham, Nicholas J.; Accuracy and Stability of Numerical Algorithms, Society for Industrial and Applied Mathematics (SIAM), Philadelphia, PA, second edition, 2002.
 Press, William H.; Teukolsky, Saul A.; Vetterling, William T.; and Flannery, Brian P.; Numerical Recipes in Fortran 77, 2nd ed., Chap. 20.2, pp. 881–886
 Forsythe, George E.; Malcolm, Michael A.; Moler, Cleve B.; "Computer Methods for Mathematical Computations", Prentice-Hall, 1977

External links
 MACHAR, a routine (in C and Fortran) to "dynamically compute machine constants" (ACM algorithm 722)
 Diagnosing floating point calculations precision, Implementation of MACHAR in Component Pascal and Oberon based on the Fortran 77 version of MACHAR published in Numerical Recipes (Press et al., 1992).

Computer arithmetic
Articles with example C code

it:Epsilon di macchina